The 2021 European Taekwondo Championships, the 24th edition of the European Taekwondo Championships, was held in Sofia, Bulgaria at the Grand Hotel Millennium Sofia from 8 to 11 April 2021.

Medal table

Medal summary

Men

Women

Team ranking

Men

Women

Participating nations

References

External links 
 Day 2 results
 Day 3 results
 Day 4 results

European Taekwondo Championships
European Championships
European Taekwondo Championships
International taekwondo competitions hosted by Bulgaria
Sports competitions in Sofia
21st century in Sofia
European Taekwondo Championships